Trachodon (meaning "rough tooth") is a dubious genus of hadrosaurid dinosaur based on teeth from the Campanian-age Upper Cretaceous Judith River Formation of Montana, U.S. It is a historically important genus with a convoluted taxonomy that has been all but abandoned by modern dinosaur paleontologists.

Despite being used for decades as the iconic duckbill dinosaur, the material it is based on is composed of teeth from both duckbills and ceratopsids (their teeth have a distinctive double root), and its describer, Joseph Leidy, came to recognize the difference and suggested limiting the genus to what would now be seen as ceratopsid teeth. Restricted to the duckbill teeth, it may have been a lambeosaurine.

History and classification
In 1856, Joseph Leidy received fragmentary remains from the Judith River Formation, collected by Ferdinand Vandeveer Hayden.  From these bones, he provided the first names for North American dinosaurs: Deinodon, Palaeoscincus, Trachodon, and Troodon (then spelled Troödon). The type species of Trachodon is T. mirabilis. The generic name is derived from Greek τραχυς, trakhys, "rough", and όδον, odon, "tooth", referring to the granulate inner surface of one of the teeth. The specific name means "marvelous" in Latin.

Trachodon was based on ANSP 9260, seven unassociated teeth, one of which had double roots.  With better remains from Hadrosaurus, he began to reconsider his taxonomy, and suggested, at least informally, that Trachodon should refer to the double-rooted tooth, and the other teeth should be referred to Hadrosaurus. In the Bone Wars that followed, and their wake, the taxonomy of Trachodon and its relatives became increasingly confusing, with one author going so far as to sink all known hadrosaur species into Trachodon except for Claosaurus agilis, but as new material was described from the Rocky Mountain region, Alberta, and Saskatchewan, later authors began progressively restricting the reach of this genus.

By 1942, and the publication of the influential Lull-Wright monograph on duckbills, its holotype was regarded as "typical of all the genera of hadrosaurian dinosaur", except for the roughened margin that gave it its name, and that they regarded as due to the tooth having not been used (p. 149). The name is no longer in use, except in historical discussions, and is considered a nomen dubium.

In 1936, paleontologist Charles Sternberg compared the holotype teeth of Trachodon mirabilis to those of more completely known hadrosaurids and noted that they were most similar to those of lambeosaurines. It has been reported that paleontologist John R. Horner also found that Trachodon teeth compare well with the teeth of lambeosaurines, specifically Corythosaurus, though they also share similarities with the genus Prosaurolophus.

Species
Numerous species have been referred to this genus, mostly before World War I. Only those originally named as a species of Trachodon are considered here.

Type species:
T. mirabilis Leidy, 1856

Other species:
T. amurense Riabinin, 1925(based on IVP AS collection, a partial skeleton from Upper Cretaceous rocks of the Amur River banks of Heilongjiang in northeast China, amended to T. amurensis and now the type species of Mandschurosaurus)
T. cantabrigiensis (nomen dubium) Lydekker, 1888 (based on BMNH R.496, a dentary tooth from the late Albian-age Lower Cretaceous Cambridge Greensand, Cambridgeshire, England, regarded as a dubious early hadrosaurid)
T. longiceps (nomen dubium) Marsh, 1897 (based on YPM 616, a large right dentary with teeth from the late Maastrichtian-age Upper Cretaceous Lance Formation of Wyoming, U.S., later assigned to Anatotitan)
T. marginatus (nomen dubium) Lambe, 1902 (based on NMC 419, disassociated postcranial material; later made the type species of the genus Stephanosaurus marginatus and then referred to Kritosaurus as Kritosaurus marginatus, which is not supported by later reviews.)
T. (Pteropelyx) selwyni (nomen dubium) Lambe, 1902 (based on NMC 290, a dentary with teeth, from the Dinosaur Park Formation of Alberta; too fragmentary to assign beyond Hadrosauridae)

Paleobiology
As a hadrosaurid, Trachodon would have been a large, bipedal/quadrupedal herbivore.

See also

 Timeline of hadrosaur research
 Eotrachodon

References

Late Cretaceous dinosaurs of North America
Hadrosaurs
Nomina dubia
Fossil taxa described in 1856
Taxa named by Joseph Leidy
Paleontology in Montana
Campanian genus first appearances
Campanian genus extinctions
Ornithischian genera